Soehrensia tarijensis,  is a species of Soehrensia, in the cactus family. It is native to Bolivia and north western Argentina.

It was formerly a species in Echinopsis.

It has 2 accepted subspecies;
 Soehrensia tarijensis subsp. bertramiana 
 Soehrensia tarijensis subsp. tarijensis

References

External links
 
 

Flora of Northwest Argentina
Flora of Bolivia
tarijensis